William C. Gianera, S.J. was appointed Santa Clara University's 22nd president after the presidency of Charles J. Walsh.

References

Gerald McKevitt, S.J. The University of Santa Clara: A History, 1851-1977 (Page 385)

1816 births
1897 deaths
21st-century Italian Jesuits
Presidents of Santa Clara University
19th-century American clergy
21st-century American clergy